The 16th New York Infantry Regiment (or 1st Northern New York Regiment) was an infantry regiment in the Union Army during the American Civil War.

Recruitment
The 16th New York Infantry was organized by company in small towns and the regiment was assembled in Albany, New York, originally under the name "1st Northern New York Infantry. The regiment mustered in for two years of service as the 16th New York Infantry on May 15, 1861, under the command of Colonel Thomas A. Davies. However, Regiments that formed later in the war and individual soldiers that reinforced the Regiment would serve three years.

Companies were principally recruited as follows: A at Ogdensburg, B and F at Potsdam, C and E at Plattsburg, D at Gouverneur, G at DePeyster, H at Stockholm, I at Malone, and K at West Chazy and Mooers.

The regiment was attached to the 2nd Brigade, 5th Division, Army of Northeastern Virginia from June 1861 to August 1861; Heintzelman's Brigade, Division of the Potomac to March 1862; Slocum's Brigade, Franklin's Division, I Corps to May 1862; 2nd Brigade, 1st Division, VI Corps to May 1863.

The regiment was originally armed with model 1840 muskets. In July 1861 the state of New York replaced these with Pattern 1853 Enfield rifle muskets.

Service

Mustered in at Albany, May 15, 1861, the regiment went into camp near Bethlehem and left the state for Washington on June 26. To Alexandria on July 11, from there to Manassas, where it was engaged but a very short time on the 21st and returned immediately after to Alexandria. On September 15, 1861, to Fort Lyon. The winter of 1861-62 was passed at Camp Franklin. Ordered to Catlett's Station April 6, 1862, but at once returned to camp; then ordered to Yorktown, where it arrived on May 3. In 1862 Major Joel J. Seaver of the regiment presented the members of the regiment with straw hats.

The regiment was in action at West Point, and at Gaines Mill, its loss being over 200 killed and wounded. Their straw hats stood out on the battlefield, making them targets for Confederate guns. The regiment was present through the remainder of that week of battle, but was not closely engaged, then encamped at Harrison's Landing until August 16, 1862, when it returned for a brief period to Alexandria. In the Battle of Crampton's Gap it was in the van and lost heavily and was held in reserve at Antietam; at Fredericksburg was posted on picket duty, and after the battle went into winter quarters near Falmouth. It shared the hardships and discomforts of the Mud March under Burnside and was active in the Battle of Chancellorsville, with a loss at Salem Church of 20 killed, 87 wounded and 49 missing. A few days were next spent at Banks' Ford, then a short time in the old camp at Falmouth, and on May 22, 1863, the regiment was mustered out at Albany. During its term of service, its loss was 112 men killed or mortally wounded and 84 deaths from other causes. The three years men were transferred to the 121st New York.

Casualties

The regiment lost a total of 213 men during service including five officers and 124 enlisted men either killed or mortally wounded and one officer and 83 enlisted men who died of diseases.

Commanders
 Colonel Thomas A. Davies
 Colonel Joseph Howland
 Colonel Joel J. Seaver
 Lieutenant Colonel Samuel Marsh
 Lieutenant Colonel Frank Palmer
 Major Buel Palmer
 Major John C. Gilmore

See also

 List of New York Civil War regiments
 New York in the Civil War

References

Sources
 Phisterer, Frederick. "New York in the War of the Rebellion" (Albany: J.B. Lyon Company), 1912.
 "The Union Army: A History of Military Affairs in the Loyal States, 1861-65 - Records of the Regiments in the Union Army - Cyclopedia of Battles - Memoirs of Commanders and Soldiers" (Madison, WI: Federal Pub. Co.), 1908.

External links
 New York State Military Museum

Military units and formations established in 1861
Military units and formations disestablished in 1863
Infantry 016
1861 establishments in New York (state)